Lee Hwan-kyung (born 1970) is a South Korean film director and screenwriter. Lee debuted with He Was Cool (2004). His next two features, Lump Sugar (2006) revolves around Si-eun who dreams of becoming a jockey and Champ (2011), which is based on a true story, depicts the relationship between a recently injured racehorse and the jockey who is gradually losing his eyesight. His fourth feature Miracle in Cell No. 7 (2013) became the biggest hit of the year with more than 12.32 million viewers.

His next project was the Chinese film Amazing Father and Daughter (2016), which started production at the end of 2015 and released in 2016.

Filmography 
Rainbow Trout (1999) - assistant director
Saulabi (2001) - screenwriter
He Was Cool (2004) - director, screenwriter, actor
Lump Sugar (2006) - director, screenwriter
Champ (2011) - director, screenwriter, producer, planner
Miracle in Cell No. 7 (2013) - director, screenwriter, planner
Amazing Father and Daughter (2016) - director
Good Neighbor (2018) - director
Best friend (2020) - director

Awards 
2006 14th Chunsa Film Art Awards: Best New Director (Lump Sugar)
2013 50th Grand Bell Awards: Best Screenplay (Miracle in Cell No. 7)
2013 50th Grand Bell Awards: Best Planning (Miracle in Cell No. 7)

References

External links 
 
 
 

1970 births
Living people
South Korean film directors
South Korean screenwriters
Seoul Institute of the Arts alumni